= Huis 't Schaep =

Coordinates: 51.204932°N 3.21996°E

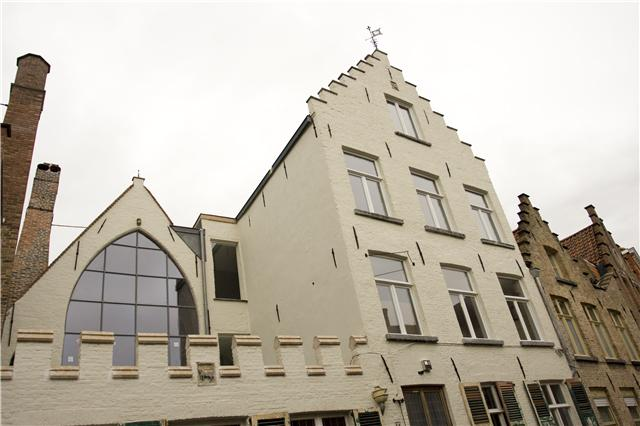
Facade

Huis 't Schaep is the name of two 17th-century dwellings, which have been converted into one house at Korte Vuldersstraat 14, 8000 Bruges, Belgium. The buildings had a step gable each, but have been remodelled in the Gothic Revival Style during the conversion by Samuel Coucke.

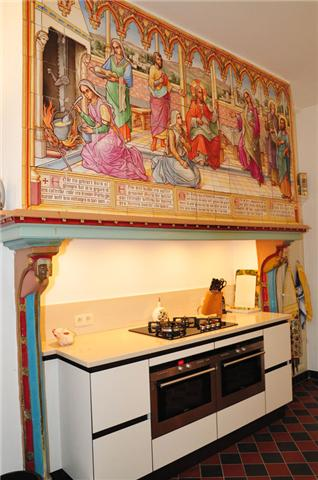
Painted Tiled Tableau

It was the house and workshop of the Coucke family, who made stained glass windows. The kilns where the stained glass was fired were situated in an annexe to the main building. Although still existing, this annexe has now become a storage space for a shoe shop and is no longer part of the main building.

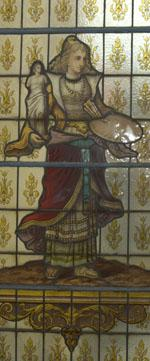
Stained Glass Window

The former house of the Coucke family still holds three original stained glass windows, as well as painted tiles on a tableau, depicting biblical scenes, which was also made by "Atelier Coucke".

The building has been a listed heritage-site since 1992. Now the building is a house as well as a bed and breakfast (chambre d'hôtes).
